Benti is a village in Kunda tehsil of Pratapgarh district in the Indian state of Uttar Pradesh. The village is located on the bank of river Ganges and near by village Bhadri.

Geography 
It is situated on the bank of the Ganges River, with Bihar towards the east, Kara tehsil towards the west, and Babaganj towards the north.

The district headquarters at Pratapgarh lie  to the west, while the state capital at Lucknow is  distant.

Baba Bhimrao Ambedkar Sanctuary 
Baba Bhimrao Ambedkar Sanctuary, or Benti Lake, is located in Benti.

Demographics
Per the 2011 Census of India, Benti has a total population of 10146; 5268 of whom are male and 4878 female.

Transport 
Kunda Harnamgnj railway station and Bhadri railway station are the very nearby railway stations to Benti. However, Allahabad Junction is a major railway station  from Benti.

References 

Villages in Pratapgarh district, Uttar Pradesh